Tammiku may refer to several places in Estonia:
Tammiku, Kohtla-Järve, a subdistrict of Ahtme district, Kohtla-Järve, Ida-Viru County
Tammiku, Jõhvi Parish, a borough in Jõhvi Parish, Ida-Viru County
Tammiku, Harju County, a village in Kose Parish, Harju County
Tammiku, Järva County, a village in Järva Parish, Järva County
Tammiku, Jõgeva County, a village in Põltsamaa Parish, Jõgeva County
Tammiku, Lääne-Nigula Parish, a village in Lääne-Nigula Parish, Lääne County
Tammiku, Haapsalu, a village in Haapsalu City, Lääne County
Tammiku, Väike-Maarja Parish, a village in Tammiku, Väike-Maarja Parish, Lääne-Viru County
Tammiku, Vinni Parish, a village in Vinni Parish, Lääne-Viru County